"What If" is a song recorded by Russian singer Dina Garipova. The song was written by Gabriel Alares, Joakim Björnberg and Leonid Gutkin. It represented Russia in the Eurovision Song Contest 2013 to be held in Malmö, Sweden. The song qualified the first semi-final of the competition on 14 May 2013 and placed 5th in the final on 18 May 2013, scoring 174 points. Dina also sang the song at the closing ceremonies of 2013 Summer Universiade in her hometown Kazan.

Track listing
Digital download 
 What If – 3:04
 What If (Karaoke version) – 3:05

Controversies
Quickly after the premiere of the song, some music portals reported possible plagiarism and copyright infringement. There was talk about the similarity to songs: "Skin on Skin" by Sarah Connor, "Pozwól żyć" by Gosia Andrzejewicz, "Painting Flowers" by All Time Low, "All Over The World" by Brian Kennedy and "Carried Away" by Hear'Say. However, the songwriters have denied the allegations.

Chart performance

References

2013 singles
Eurovision songs of 2013
Eurovision songs of Russia
2013 songs
Universal Music Group singles
Songs written by Gabriel Alares
English-language Russian songs